Kollemcode (also spelled Kollencode, Kollangode, Kollamkode) is a municipality in Kanyakumari district, India. Kollencode is situated in Tamil Nadu-Kerala border. It has 33 wards. It is a coastal village on the shores of the Arabian Sea. Kollamcode is located 41 kilometres from Nagercoil and 36 kilometres from Thiruvananthapuram, the capital of Kerala, and also 64 kilometres from Kanyakumari

This village is famous for the Thookam Festival, celebrated by all without regard to caste and religion. It is celebrated once a year usually a date in March or April when the Bharani comes in Meenam month in Malayalam calendar). Kollamcode is also famous for its Bhadrakaliamman temple which draws large pilgrimages especially during the Thookam festival. It is believed that if childless couples visit the temple during the festival they will be blessed with a child. Chairperson Rani (DMK), Vice Chairperson Baby (Congress) were elected through the indirect election on March 4, 2022.

References 

Tamil Nadu